Jukka Puotila (born 9 September 1955) is a Finnish actor and impersonator. He appeared in more than sixty films since 1981. In television, he is best known as Pertti Mäkimaa in Yle TV1's drama series Kotikatu (1995–2012).

He has imitated several famous Finnish people, such as Sauli Niinistö, Paavo Väyrynen, Timo Soini, Antero Mertaranta, Carl-Erik Creutz, Raimo Ilaskivi, Tommi Mäkinen and Seppo Kääriäinen.

Selected filmography

References

External links 

1955 births
Living people
Finnish male film actors